is a Japanese professional baseball infielder. He is currently a free agent. He previously played for the Chunichi Dragons in Japan's Nippon Professional Baseball.

External links

1989 births
Living people
Asian Games bronze medalists for Japan
Asian Games medalists in baseball
Baseball players at the 2014 Asian Games
Chunichi Dragons players
Japanese baseball players
Medalists at the 2014 Asian Games
Nippon Professional Baseball outfielders
Nippon Professional Baseball second basemen
Nippon Professional Baseball shortstops
People from Tokyo
21st-century Japanese people